Cadogan Hall  is a 950-seat capacity concert hall in Sloane Terrace in Chelsea in the Royal Borough of Kensington and Chelsea, London, England. 
 
The resident music ensemble at Cadogan Hall is the Royal Philharmonic Orchestra (RPO), the first London orchestra to have a permanent home. Cadogan Estates offered the RPO the use of the hall as its principal venue in late 2001. The RPO gave its first concert as the resident ensemble of Cadogan Hall in November 2004.  Since 2005, Cadogan Hall has also served as the venue for The Proms' chamber music concerts during Monday lunchtimes and Proms Saturday matinees; it is also one of the two main London venues of the Orpheus Sinfonia.

Cadogan Hall has also been used as a recording venue. In February 2006, a recording of Mozart symphonies with John Eliot Gardiner and the English Baroque Soloists was produced and made available immediately after the performances. In 2009, art rock band Marillion recorded a concert there which was released on the album Live from Cadogan in 2011.

Building

The building is a former Church of Christ, Scientist church, completed in 1907 to designs in the Byzantine Revival style by architect Robert Fellowes Chisholm, who also designed the Napier Museum in Kerala, India. The stained glass is by the Danish sculptor and stained-glass artist Arild Rosenkrantz. The building was listed Grade II on the National Heritage List for England in April 1969.

Organ
The church had a three-manual pipe organ built by J. W. Walker & Sons Ltd in 1907 and installed in 1911. It was on a raised position on the platform. The organ was removed in 2004, and the pipes in 2006. The original intention had been to install the organ in a church in the Midlands, but instead, in 2009-10, it was installed in Christ the King Catholic Church in Gothenburg, Sweden. Walker's organ case remains in place in the concert hall.

Conversion to a concert hall
By 1996, the congregation had diminished dramatically and the building had fallen into disuse.  Mohamed Fayed, then owner of Harrods, had acquired the property, but was unable to secure permission to convert the building to a palatial luxury house on account of its status as a listed building. Cadogan Estates Ltd (the property company owned by Earl Cadogan, whose ancestors have been the main landowners in Chelsea since the 18th century; the nearby Cadogan Square and Cadogan Place are also named after them) purchased the building in 2000. It was refurbished in 2004 by Paul Davis and Partners Architects at a cost of £7.5 million. The changes included new lighting and sound systems and bespoke acoustic ceiling modules in the performance space.

See also
 List of concert halls

References

External links

 
 The Proms' page on Cadogan Hall
 Tim Ashley, "Let's not forget about the Cadogan Hall Proms". The Guardian Music Blog, 19 July 2007

2004 establishments in England
Byzantine Revival architecture in the United Kingdom
Cadogan Estate
Christian Science in England
Churches completed in 1907
Concert halls in London
Former Christian Science churches, societies and buildings
Grade II listed buildings in the Royal Borough of Kensington and Chelsea
Grade II listed churches in the Royal Borough of Kensington and Chelsea
Tourist attractions in the Royal Borough of Kensington and Chelsea